Krvavac II is a village in the Kula Norinska municipality.

Demographics

References 

Populated places in Dubrovnik-Neretva County